The 18th AVN Awards ceremony, presented by Adult Video News (AVN), took place January 8, 2001 at the Venetian Hotel Grand Ballroom, at Paradise, Nevada, U.S.A. During the ceremony, AVN presented AVN Awards in 77 categories honoring the best pornographic films released between Oct. 1, 1999 and Sept. 30, 2000. The ceremony was produced by Gary Miller and directed by Mark Stone. Adult film star Jenna Jameson hosted the show for the second time.

The year's biggest winner was Dark Angels with six awards, including best Video Feature and Best Director—Video for Nic Andrews, however, Watchers won for Best Film while capturing three additional trophies. Other multiple winners included: Les Vampyres with five awards, Dream Quest with four and Raw and West Side each with three.

Winners and nominees

The nominees for the 19th AVN Awards were announced in November 2000. Dream Quest led the way with 20, followed by Watchers with 18, Les Vampyres with 17, West Side with 16, Raw with 15, Dark Angels with 14, Jekyll and Hyde with 12 and A Midsummer Night's Cream, Artemesia and In the Days of Whore with 10 apiece.

The winners were announced during the awards ceremony on January 8, 2001.

Major awards

Winners are listed first, highlighted in boldface, and indicated with a double dagger.

Additional Award Winners 

 Best All-Girl Feature: Hard Love/How to Fuck in High Heels
 Best All-Girl Series: The Violation of...
 Best Alternative Video: Dream Girls: Real Adventures 18
 Best Anal Sex Scene—Film: Randy Spears, Inari Vachs; Façade
 Best Anal Sex Scene—Video: "Kristi Myst's Anal Gang Bang" (Kristy Myst, Anthony Crane, Arnold Schwartzenpecker, Brandon Iron, Brian Surewood, Dick Nasty, Gino Greco, John Strong, Rod Fontana, Trevor Thompson, Valentino), In the Days of Whore
 Best Anal-Themed Feature: Rocco's True Anal Stories 11
 Best Anal-Themed Series: Rocco's True Anal Stories
 Best Art Direction—Film: Jekyll and Hyde
 Best Art Direction—Video: Shayla's Web
 Best Box Cover Concept: Les Vampyres, Cal Vista Films/Metro
 Best Cinematography: Ralph Parfait, Jake Jacobs; Dream Quest
 Best Classic Release on DVD: Chameleons Not the Sequel
 Best Continuing Video Series: Pick Up Lines, Hollywood Hardcore (tie)
 Best Director—Foreign Release: Tanya Hyde; Hell, Whores and High Heels (Pirate Video 10)
 Best DVD Extras: All Star
 Best Editing—Film: Michael Raven, Sammy Slater; Watchers
 Best Editing—Video: Nic Andrews, Dark Angels
 Best Ethnic-Themed Release: Panochitas 5
 Best Foreign Vignette Series: Private XXX
 Best Foreign Vignette Tape: Hell, Whores and High Heels (Pirate Video 10)
 Best Group Sex Scene—Film: Violet Luv, Wendi Knight, Brandon Iron; Les Vampyres
 Best Group Sex Scene—Video: Hakan Serbes, Alisha Klass, McKayla Matthews; Mission to Uranus
 Best Interactive DVD: Virtual Sex With Tera Patrick
 Best Music: Derik Andrews, Inversion 89; Dark Angels

 Best Non-Sex Performance—Film or Video: Rob Spallone, The Sopornos
 Best Oral-Themed Feature: Blowjob Adventures of Dr. Fellatio 26
 Best Oral-Themed Series: Blowjob Adventures of Dr. Fellatio
 Best Overall Marketing Campaign—Company Image: Vivid Entertainment Group
 Best Overall Marketing Campaign—Individual Title or Series: Les Vampyres, Cal Vista Films/Metro
 Best Packaging: Dream Quest, Wicked Pictures
 Best Pro-Am or Amateur Series: Up and Cummers
 Best Pro-Am or Amateur Tape: California College Student Bodies 16
 Best Screenplay—Film: Michael Raven, George Kaplan; Watchers
 Best Screenplay—Video: Antonio Passolini, Raw
 Best Solo Sex Scene: Devinn Lane, In Style
 Best Special Effects: Intimate Expressions
 Best Specialty Tape—Bondage and S/M: Humiliation of Heidi
 Best Specialty Tape—Big Bust: Harem Hooters
 Best Specialty Tape—Other Genre: Barefoot Confidential 8
 Best Specialty Tape—Spanking: Public Canings
 Best Supporting Actor—Film: Randy Spears, Watchers
 Best Supporting Actor—Video: Wilde Oscar, West Side
 Best Supporting Actress—Film: Chloe, True Blue
 Best Tease Performance: Jessica Drake, Shayla's Web
 Best Transsexual Tape: Rogue Adventures: Big Ass She-Males 7
 Best Videography: Nic Andrews, Jake Jacobs; Dark Angels
 Best Vignette Tape: Terrors From the Clit 2
 Best Vignette Series: Perverted Stories
 Most Outrageous Sex Scene: “The Detached Cock” with Bridgette Kerkove, Tyce Bune; In the Days of Whore

Honorary AVN Awards

Reuben Sturman Award
 Ed Powers, Mark Kernes

Hall of Fame
AVN Hall of Fame inductees for 2001 were: Kaitlyn Ashley, John T. Bone, Asia Carrera, Bud Lee, Shayla La Veaux, Clive McLean, Earl Miller, Tiffany Mynx, Reb Sawitz, Sunset Thomas, Bob Vosse, Honey Wilder, Sam Xavier

Multiple nominations and awards

The following releases received the most nominations.

 The following 15 releases received multiple awards:

Presenters and performers

The following individuals presented awards or performed musical numbers or comedy. The show's trophy girls were Haven and Lacey.

Presenters  (in order of appearance)

Performers

Ceremony information 

The awards show marked the premiere of its new trophy design, which Adult Video News called "an original 3-D Lucite monolith that hailed the long awaited Demise of the Golden Bitch."

The year's show featured a "Pussy Cam", a floor-level camera near the stage's podium, which offered attendees an infrequent glimpse of female stars lingerie or lack thereof. In his moment at the podium, actor Mark Davis offered female attendees equal time by dropping his trousers for the audience's supposed benefit.

The show was recorded and a DVD of the show was published and distributed by VCA Interactive.

Performance of year's movies

Dream Quest was announced as the adult movie industry's top selling movie and was also the top renting movie of the previous year.

Critical reviews

The show received a negative reception from Adult DVD Talk. An article by Groundskeeper Willie was titled, "The Adult Video Snooze Awars" and besides having found the show slow and monotonous with occasional gaffes, he also took organizers to task for not using film or video clips during the show, even in the major categories.

Hustler magazine agreed that "the ceremony dragged on for what seemed like an eternity but still managed to entertain, despite the shaky hositn gskills of cock-shy Jenna Jameson" and also decried the $195 fee for admission tickets.

Notes

References

External links
 
 2001 AVN Award nominees (archived at Wayback Machine, March 9, 2001)
 2001 AVN Awards Winners (archived at Wayback Machine, February 3, 2001)
 Adult Video News Awards  at the Internet Movie Database
 
 
 

AVN Awards
2000 film awards